Vlašić is a low mountain in western Serbia, between towns of Osečina and Koceljeva. Its highest peak has an elevation of 474 meters or 1555 feet above sea level.

References

Mountains of Serbia